Keely Shaw (born July 18, 1994) is a Canadian track cyclist. She represented Canada at the 2020 Summer Paralympics, in Women's individual pursuit C4 winning a bronze medal.

Early life and education
She graduated from University of Saskatchewan with a Bachelor's degree in Kinesiology. She then went on to complete a Master's degree at the University of Saskatchewan in the area of exercise physiology and sport nutrition with a thesis titled "The Effect of Dark Chocolate on Metabolism and Performance in Trained Cyclists at Simulated Altitude". She continued her education with a Ph. D. in exercise physiology and sport nutrition with a special focus on sport nutrition for special populations, namely female, master's, and Paralympic athletes.

Career
Keely began her cycling career in 2017 and made a quick jump to the National team, earning a 5th place in the Individual pursuit in the women's C4 category at Paracycling Track World Championships in 2018 before earning her first World Championship podium in 2019 at the UCI Para-cycling Track World Championships. In 2021 Keely made her Paralympics debut, where she won a bronze medal in the Women's C4 individual time trial with a time of 3:48.342

References

External links
 

1994 births
Living people
Canadian female cyclists
Paralympic cyclists of Canada
Cyclists at the 2020 Summer Paralympics
Medalists at the 2020 Summer Paralympics
Paralympic bronze medalists for Canada
20th-century Canadian women
21st-century Canadian women